Cryobacterium is a Gram-positive and strictly aerobic bacterial genus from the family of Microbacteriaceae.

References

Further reading 
 
 

Microbacteriaceae
Bacteria genera